The 1914 U.S. National Championships (now known as the US Open) took place on the outdoor grass courts at the Newport Casino in Newport, United States. The men's singles tournament ran from 24 August until 1 September while the women's singles and doubles championship took place from 8 June to 13 June at the Philadelphia Cricket Club in Chestnut Hill. It was the 34th staging of the U.S. National Championships, and the second Grand Slam tennis event of the year. It was the final edition of the national championships held at the Newport Casino in Newport, Rhode Island before relocation to the West Side Tennis Club at Forest Hills, New York.

Participation in the tournament was affected by the outbreak of World War I. The 1914 Wimbledon finalists Norman Brookes and Anthony Wilding had won the Davis Cup for Australasia two weeks before the tournament, defeating the United States team in the challenge round played at the West Side Tennis Club in New York. Both players were entered for the U.S. National Championships but withdrew and returned to England.

Finals

Men's singles

 R. Norris Williams defeated  Maurice McLoughlin  6–3, 8–6, 10–8

Women's singles

 Mary Browne defeated  Marie Wagner  6–2, 1–6, 6–1

Men's doubles
 Maurice McLoughlin /  Tom Bundy defeated  George Church /  Dean Mathey 6–4, 6–2, 6–4

Women's doubles
 Mary Browne /  Louise Riddell Williams defeated  Louise Hammond Raymond /  Edna Wildey 10–8, 6–2

Mixed doubles
 Mary Browne /  Bill Tilden defeated  Margarette Myers /  J. R. Rowland 6–1, 6–4

References

External links
Official US Open website

 
U.S. National Championships
U.S. National Championships (tennis) by year
U.S. National Championships (tennis)
U.S. National Championships (tennis)
U.S. National Championships (tennis)
U.S. National Championships (tennis)
U.S. National Championships (tennis)
U.S. National Championships (tennis)